If We All Were Angels may refer to:
 If We All Were Angels (1936 film), a German comedy film
 If We All Were Angels (1956 film), a West German comedy film, a remake of the 1936 film